The Super Young Team is a Japanese superhero team in the . The team first appears in Final Crisis Sketchbook #1 (May 2008), and was created by Grant Morrison and J. G. Jones.

Publication history
The concept for the team emerged from the same pitch Grant Morrison made that contained the idea for the Great Ten, and they were first mentioned in 52 #6. They are influenced by American superheroes and Japanese pop culture.

The characters first appeared in Morrison's Final Crisis where they were revealed to be the Fifth World incarnations of the Forever People. They are featured in Final Crisis Aftermath: Dance, written by Joe Casey with art by ChrisCross. In that six-part series, their fame overwhelms them, causing judgement errors and loss of self-control.

Membership

Most Excellent Superbat
Most Excellent Superbat (Heino) is the team leader. He wears a wildly stylized red and yellow uniform influenced by both Superman and Batman. According to him, his power is "being so rich he can do anything", but he appears to use an array of gadgets, one of which can generate an energy-based exoskeleton, he also appears to have some training in the martial arts. His secret island base is called the "Most Serene Sanctuary" and contains a supercomputer he calls a "unified data field" which is only accessible when he meditated himself into a calm theta rhythm state.Final Crisis Aftermath: Dance #1, the ghost of a being calling itself "Ultimon Alpha" recently appeared to him in a vision.

By the end of the series, he revealed that he is indeed as rich as he claims when he actually buys Japan.

Big Atomic Lantern Boy
Big Atomic Lantern Boy is Most Excellent Superbat's second in command. He wears a green outfit which is outfitted with an x-rayed circular porthole on his chest. The porthole displays his skeleton, and allows him to fire green force beams of different types of radiation. He is attracted to Shiny Happy Aquazon.

Crazy Shy Lolita Canary
Crazy Shy Lolita Canary is a winged heroine in a Japanese schoolgirl uniform, and is physically small enough to fit in someone's hand. She possesses a sonic scream (always "Sumimasen" - "Excuse me") similar to that possessed by Black Canary except that it appears to be a strong modulated-mixture of multiple voices.

Shiny Happy Aquazon
Shiny Happy Aquazon is the daughter of Junior Waveman (Riki Kimura) - a founding member of Big Science Action - and the genius daughter of Senior Waveman Otomo. She has the ability to create hardwater constructs like Mera, the wife of Aquaman. She also is attracted to Sonic Lightning Flash. In Final Crisis Aftermath: Dance #4, her father who is now Senior Waveman Kimura invites her to become a member of Big Science Action.

Well-Spoken Sonic Lightning Flash
Well-Spoken Sonic Lightning Flash is a young speedster whose real name is Keigo, with a round helmet and giant athletic shoes. He is capable of running up to 500 mph.

Sunny Sumo
The group recruits Sunny Sumo, a powerful wrestler with self-healing abilities and the potential to resist mind control. The original Sumo had assisted the Forever People in their original series, but had been stranded in ancient Japan where he lived out a peaceful life; the Sunny Sumo who joined the Super Young Team was a refugee from Earth-51, escaping before it was destroyed.

Equipment
The Super Young Team has a vehicle called the Wonder Wagon, which is a car capable of powered flight, similar to the Newsboy Legion's Whiz Wagon.

References

External links
Newsarama: Final Crisis Sketchbook (May 14, 2008)
Newsarama: Grant Morrison on Final Crisis #2 (July 21, 2008)
The Annotated Final Crisis: Issue #2
The Annotated Final Crisis: Issue #4
The Annotated Final Crisis: Issue #6
The Annotated Final Crisis: Issue #7
DC Database Project: Super Young Team
Comicvine: Super Young Team

DC Comics superhero teams
Comics characters introduced in 2008
Characters created by Grant Morrison
Child superheroes